Varun Chopra (born 1 February 2000) is an Irish cricketer. He made his Twenty20 debut for North West Warriors in the 2018 Inter-Provincial Trophy on 7 July 2018. Prior to his Twenty20 debut, he was part of Ireland's squads for the 2016 Under-19 Cricket World Cup and the 2018 Under-19 Cricket World Cup. He made his List A debut for North West Warriors in the 2020 Inter-Provincial Cup on 22 September 2020.

References

External links
 

2000 births
Living people
Irish cricketers
Place of birth missing (living people)
North West Warriors cricketers
Irish people of Indian descent